Our New Quarters is the second album by Julian Fane, released in 2007.

Track listing
"Our New Quarters" – 3:16
"New Faces" – 5:03
"Youth Cadet" – 4:41
"Where are you moon
"Downfall" – 3:37
"Jonah The Freak" – 5:32
"Break And Enter" – 3:21
"Rattle" – 4:46
"Among The Missing" – 4:37
"Plastics For A Heart" – 4:11

2008 albums